Abildsø Idrettslag is a sports club in the suburb of Abildsø, Oslo.

The sports club has a membership of around 400.

History 
Abildsø Idrettslag was formed in September 1931, and competed in the Arbeidernes Idrettsforbund. The club had cycling, athletics, bandy, skiing, handball, and football on the programme. In the 1970s and 1980s, the ski team folded. The last decade has seen the football team become the focus of the club. In the 2001 season, the club had 21 teams competing. In addition, they had 7 teams run jointly with other clubs.

Football 
The club owns a large football field, and a club house with four changing rooms at Østensjøvannet. There are also two training pitches, two seven-a-side pitches, and two pitches for the women's side, as well as an all-weather pitch. Work began on a new all-weather pitch at Abildsø on 4 May 2009.

The club played in the Norwegian Second Division as late as in 1999.

Recent seasons

Men

Women

References

External links 
Official homepage

Association football clubs established in 1931
Bandy clubs established in 1931
Handball clubs established in 1931
Football clubs in Oslo
Arbeidernes Idrettsforbund